Charles Louis McKeehan (March 29, 1876 – March 23, 1925) was a United States district judge of the United States District Court for the Eastern District of Pennsylvania.

Education and career

Born in Philadelphia, Pennsylvania, McKeehan received an Artium Baccalaureus degree from the University of Pennsylvania in 1897 and a Bachelor of Laws from the University of Pennsylvania Law School in 1900. He was in private practice in Philadelphia from 1900 to 1923. On March 1, 1912, he, along with William W. Montgomery and future United States Supreme Court Justice Owen J. Roberts, founded Roberts, Montgomery & McKeehan, the predecessor of the law firm Montgomery, McCracken, Walker & Rhoads, LLP. He served as a lieutenant colonel in the United States Army during World War I from 1917 to 1919.

Federal judicial service

On January 30, 1923, McKeehan was nominated by President Warren G. Harding to a new seat on the United States District Court for the Eastern District of Pennsylvania created by 42 Stat. 837. He was confirmed by the United States Senate on February 9, 1923, and received his commission the same day. McKeehan served in that capacity until his death on March 23, 1925.

References

Sources
 

1876 births
1925 deaths
Judges of the United States District Court for the Eastern District of Pennsylvania
United States district court judges appointed by Warren G. Harding
20th-century American judges
University of Pennsylvania Law School alumni
United States Army colonels
Lawyers from Philadelphia
United States Army personnel of World War I